The August Prize is an annual Swedish literary prize awarded each year since 1989 by the Swedish Publishers' Association. The prize is awarded to the best Swedish book of the year, in three categories.

Prize
In the years 1989-1992, the prize was awarded in one general category. Since 1992, the prize has been awarded in the categories Fiction, Non-Fiction, and Children's and Youth Literature. The prize is named after the writer August Strindberg.

Selection
All Swedish publishers may submit nominations for the award. In each category, a jury shortlists six titles each. These titles are then read and voted on by an assembly of 63 electors, 21 in each category. The electors come from across the country, and comprise booksellers, librarians and literary critics. The books receiving the largest number of votes in each category win the prize.

The prizes are handed out at a gala in Stockholm. Winners receive 100,000 Swedish krona and a bronze statuette by the artist Michael Fare.

Winners & nominees

Best book (1989–1991)

Fiction

Non-fiction

Children & Young Adult

References

Notes

External links
 Official website 

 
Awards established in 1989
Swedish literary awards
1989 establishments in Sweden